The De Soto County-class tank landing ship was a class of tank landing ship of United States Navy and later sold to the Italian and Brazilian Navy.

Development 
In the 1950s, eight ships were authorized to begin construction but one was later cancelled as the ship's contract was not awarded. The remaining seven ships were put into service between 1957 to 1959. The ships were designed to give a comfortable experience for the crew thus the ships were air conditioned. They have the capability of carrying vehicles or equipments up to 75 tons and 87.7 meters.

Five ships were decommissioned in 1972, with LST-1171 and LST-1175 being sold to Italy. Brazil too acquired LST-1174 and commissioned her into service. LST-1176 was converted into a patrol gunboat support ship and reclassified as AGP-1176. LST-1178 was to be converted into a support ship for the Pegasus-class hydrofoils but plans later fell through.

Ships of class

Citations

 

De Soto County-class tank landing ships
Amphibious warfare vessel classes
Tank landing ships